Arabic Post (Arabic: عربي بوست), formerly known as HuffPost Arabi (Arabic: عربي HuffPost) was an Arabic-language news web site founded by Wadah Khanfar, the former CEO of Al Jazeera Media Network in partnership with The Huffington Post. On 30 March 2018, HuffPost Arabi announced that it will no longer be publishing content.

References

External links 
 Huffpost Arabi (in Arabic)

British news websites
Arabic-language websites
2015 establishments in the United Kingdom
HuffPost